Avoparcin is a glycopeptide antibiotic effective against Gram-positive bacteria. It has been used in agriculture as an additive to livestock feed to promote growth in chickens, pigs, and cattle. It is also used as an aid in the prevention of necrotic enteritis in poultry.

Avoparcin is a mixture of two closely related chemical compounds, known as α-avoparcin and β-avoparcin, which differ by the presence of an additional chlorine atom in β-avoparcin.  Avoparcin also shares a chemical similarity with vancomycin.  Because of this similarity, concern exists that widespread use of avoparcin in animals may lead to an increased prevalence of vancomycin-resistant strains of bacteria.

Avoparcin was once widely used in Australia and the European Union, but it is currently not permitted in either.  It was never approved for use in the United States.

References

Glycopeptide antibiotics